Radlands is the fourth studio album by the Mystery Jets. On 3 April 2012, shortly before the release of Radlands, Kai Fish announced he would be leaving the band, with bassist Pete Cochrane taking his place for the band's UK tour.

The album was recorded in a home recording studio set up in a country house by the Colorado river in the Westlake area in Austin, Texas.

The album peaked at number 40 on the UK Albums Chart.

The name 'Radlands' is an amalgamation of Keith Richards' 1960s apartment Redlands and the Terrence Malick film Badlands.

Track listing

References 

2012 albums
Mystery Jets albums
Rough Trade Records albums
Albums produced by Dan Carey (record producer)